José Nivaldo Martins Constante (born 14 March 1974), better known as Nivaldo, is a Brazilian retired footballer who played as a goalkeeper.

Club career
Born in Torres, Rio Grande do Sul, Nivaldo made his senior debuts with Araranguá Esporte Clube in 1995. He was released in the end of the year, and subsequently played for Campeonato Gaúcho third level sides, also appearing for some clubs in Nordeste.

Nivaldo joined Guarani de Venâncio Aires in 1998, being a regular starter for the side. In December 2000 he moved to Esportivo Bento Gonçalves, being an ever-present figure for the club during his six-year spell.

On 11 April 2006 Nivaldo joined Chapecoense, with the club in a financial crisis. With the side he was a starter during the Série D, Série C and Série B promotion campaigns, making his debut in the latter division on 25 May 2013, in a 4–1 away win against Boa Esporte.

Nivaldo remained at Chape during the 2014 season, but as a backup to Danilo. He made his Série A debut on 30 November 2014, aged already 40, coming on as a second-half substitute for the former in a 1–1 home draw against Cruzeiro. He was also the first goalkeeper ever to play in all Brazilian four divisions, and the third player of his club.

Nivaldo did not board LaMia Airlines Flight 2933 for the 2016 Copa Sudamericana Finals, which crashed and killed 19 of his teammates. After the tragedy, he announced his retirement from football. With the Brazilian Football Confederation announcing that Chapecoense must fulfill their final fixture of the 2016 Série A, Nivaldo announced his intention to compete in a final game in tribute to his teammates; as the last match against Atlético Mineiro was not disputed, he retired after the tournament's end.

Career statistics

Honours
Chapecoense
Copa Santa Catarina: 2006
Campeonato Catarinense: 2007, 2011, 2016

References

External links

1974 births
Living people
Sportspeople from Rio Grande do Sul
Brazilian footballers
Association football goalkeepers
Campeonato Brasileiro Série A players
Campeonato Brasileiro Série B players
Campeonato Brasileiro Série C players
Campeonato Brasileiro Série D players
Clube Esportivo Bento Gonçalves players
Associação Chapecoense de Futebol players